David R. Lindberg (1948, U.S.A.) is an American malacologist and professor of integrative biology at the University of California, Berkeley. He is also the Curator for the University of California Museum of Paleontology and co-editor of the journal Molecular Systematics and Phylogeography of Mollusks.

Much of his work has focused on sea snails, specifically on limpets, on the phylogeny of the Patellogastropoda, and various other gastropod groups.

Lindberg renamed the order Docoglossa to Patellogastropoda in 1986. He is also notable for naming the subclass Eogastropoda, and proposing that the taxonomy of the Gastropoda be rewritten in terms of strictly monophyletic groups.

Genera and species containing the name Lindberg 
Although these species were named in honor of one or more people who had the surname Lindberg, judging from the year the species were named, only a few of the following taxa were named in honor of David R. Lindberg.
 Bathyglycinde lindbergi (Uschakov, 1955)
 Bathyraja lindbergi Ishiyama & Ishihara, 1977
 Bogidiella lindbergi Ruffo, 1958
 Cyclopteropsis lindbergi Soldatov, 1930
 Dugesia lindbergi de Beauchamp, 1959
 Eualus lindbergi Kobyakova, 1955
 Genioliparis lindbergi Andriashev & Neyelov, 1976
 Glycinde lindbergi Uschakov, 1955 : synonym of Bathyglycinde lindbergi (Uschakov, 1955)
 Gobio gobio lepidolaemus natio lindbergi Turdakov & Piskarev, 1955 : synonym of Gobio gobio gobio (Linnaeus, 1758)
 Gurjanovilia lindbergi Jakovleva, 1952 : synonym of Tripoplax lindbergi (Jakovleva, 1952)
 Hadropogonichthys lindbergi Fedorov, 1982
 Halicyclops lindbergi Rocha C.E.F., 1995
 Iothia lindbergi McLean, 1985
 Lindbergichthys
 Lindbergichthys mizops (Günther, 1880) : synonym of  Lepidonotothen mizops (Günther, 1880)
 Lindbergichthys nudifrons (Lönnberg, 1905) : synonym of Lepidonotothen nudifrons (Lönnberg, 1905)
 Liparis lindbergi Krasyukova, 1984 : synonym of  Liparis latifrons Schmidt, 1950
 Lottia lindbergi Sasaki & Okutani, 1994
 Lycodes lindbergi Popov, 1931 : synonym of Lycodes uschakovi Popov, 1931
 Machilis lindbergi Wygodzinsky, 1959
 Mesochra lindbergi Petkovski, 1964
 Mycale lindbergi Koltun, 1958
 Peramphithoe lindbergi (Gurjanova, 1938)
 Potamon gedrosianum lindbergi Pretzmann, 1966 : synonym of Potamon ruttneri Pretzmann, 1962
 Sarothrogammarus lindbergi G. Karaman, 1969
 Scoiiodota lindbergi D'yakonov in D'yakonov et al., 1958 : synonym of  Scoliodotella lindbergi (D'yakonov in D'yakonov et al., 1958)
 Scoliodota lindbergi
 Scoliodotella lindbergi (D'yakonov in D'yakonov et al., 1958)
 Tripoplax lindbergi (Jakovleva, 1952)

See also 
 Taxonomy of the Gastropoda (Ponder & Lindberg, 1997)

References

External links
Webpages for LindLab at Berkeley
His profile at Berkeley

American malacologists
Members of the International Society for Science and Religion
University of California, Berkeley College of Letters and Science faculty
1948 births
Living people